Tetramethylurea is the organic compound with the formula (Me2N)2CO.  It is a substituted urea.  This colorless liquid is used as an aprotic-polar solvent, especially for aromatic compounds and is used e. g. for Grignard reagents.

Production
The synthesis and properties of tetramethylurea were comprehensively described. 

The reaction of dimethylamine with phosgene in the presence of e. g. 50 % sodium hydroxide solution and subsequent extraction with 1,2-dichloroethane yields tetramethylurea in 95% yield.

The reactions with dimethylcarbamoyl chloride or phosgene are highly exothermic and the removal of the resulting dimethylamine hydrochloride requires some effort.

The reaction of diphenylcarbonate with dimethylamine in an autoclave is also effective.

Tetramethylurea is formed in the reaction of dimethylcarbamoyl chloride with anhydrous sodium carbonate in a yield of 96.5%.

Dimethylcarbamoyl chloride also reacts with excess dimethylamine forming tetramethylurea. Even though the product is contaminated and smelly it may be purified by addition of calcium oxide and subsequent fractional distillation.

Tetramethylurea is also formed during the oxidation of tetrakis(dimethylamino)ethylene (TDAE), a very electron-rich alkene and a strong reducing agent, available from tris(dimethylamino)methane by pyrolysis or from chlorotrifluoroethene and dimethylamine.

Tetrakis(dimethylamino)ethylene (TDAE) reacts with oxygen in a (2+2) cycloaddition reaction to a 1,2-dioxetane which decomposes to electronically excited tetramethylurea. This returns to the ground state while emitting green light with an emission maximum at 515 nm.

Properties
Tetramethylurea is a clear, colorless liquid with mild aromatic odor that is miscible with water and many organic solvents. Unusual for an urea is the liquid state of tetramethylurea in a range of > 170 °C.

Applications
Tetramethylurea is miscible with a variety of organic compounds, including acids such as acetic acid or bases such as pyridine and an excellent solvent for organic substances such as ε-caprolactam or benzoic acid and dissolves even some inorganic salts such as silver nitrate or sodium iodide. Due to its distinct solvent properties tetramethylurea is often used as a replacement for the carcinogenic hexamethylphosphoramide (HMPT).

Tetramethylurea is suitable as a reaction medium for the polymerization of aromatic diacid chlorides (such as isophthalic acid) and aromatic diamines (such as 1,3-diaminobenzene (m-phenylenediamine)) to aramids such as poly (m-phenylene isophthalamide) (Nomex®)

The polymerization of 4-amino benzoic acid chloride hydrochloride in tetramethylurea provides isotropic viscous solutions of poly(p-benzamide) (PPB), which can be directly spun into fibers.

In a tetramethylurea-LiCl mixture stable isotropic solutions can be obtained up to a PPB polymer concentration of 14%.

Tetramethylurea also dissolves cellulose ester and swells other polymers such as polycarbonates, polyvinyl chloride or aliphatic polyamides, usually at elevated temperature.

Strong and hindered non-nucleophilic guanidine bases are accessible from tetramethylurea in a simple manner, which are in contrast to the fused amidine bases DBN or DBU not alkylated.

A modification of the Koenigs-Knorr reaction for building glycosides from 2,3,4,6-tetra-O-acetyl-α-D-glucopyranosyl bromide (acetobromoglucose) originates from S. Hanessian who used the silver salt silver trifluoromethanesulfonate (TfOAg) and as a proton acceptor tetramethylurea. This process variant is characterized by a simplified process control, high anomeric purity and high yields of the products. If the reaction is carried out with acetobromoglucose and silver triflate/tetramethylurea at room temperature, then tetramethylurea reacts not only as a base, but also with the glycosyl to form a good isolable uroniumtriflates in 56% yield.

Safety
The acute toxicity of tetramethylurea is moderate. However, it is embryotoxic and teratogenic towards several animal species.

References

Ureas
Amide solvents